Neil Gough (born 1 September 1981) is an English former professional footballer who played in the Football League as a forward. He is currently first team coach at Basildon United Football Club.

References

1981 births
Living people
Sportspeople from Harlow
English footballers
Association football forwards
Leyton Orient F.C. players
Chelmsford City F.C. players
Hampton & Richmond Borough F.C. players
Heybridge Swifts F.C. players
Hereford United F.C. players
Barry Town United F.C. players
St Albans City F.C. players
English Football League players
Cymru Premier players
Association football coaches